Cassava vein mosaic virus (CsVMV) is a plant pathogenic virus of the family Caulimoviridae.

External links
ICTVdB – The Universal Virus Database: Cassava vein mosaic virus
Family Groups – The Baltimore Method

Caulimoviridae
Viral plant pathogens and diseases